The 4th Combat Engineer Battalion (4th CEB) is a combat engineer battalion of the United States Marine Corps Reserve. The headquarters is in Baltimore, Maryland and the Battalion has units in West Virginia, Alabama, Virginia, and Tennessee. They belong to the 4th Marine Division of the Marine Forces Reserve.

Current Units

History

World War II
Activated 25 August 1943 at Camp Pendleton, California, as Headquarters Company, 1st Battalion, 20th Marines, 4th Marine Division, Fleet Marine Force. Deployed during February 1944 to the Pacific Theater. Redesignated 31 August, as Headquarters and Service Company, 4th Engineer Battalion, 4th Marine Division. Participated in the Battle of Kwajalein, Battle of Saipan, Battle of Tinian and the Battle of Iwo Jima. Redeployed during October 1945 to Maui, Hawaii. Relocated during November 1945 to Camp Pendleton, California, where it was deactivated on 15 November 1945.

1951–2000
Reactivated on 1 November 1951 at Baltimore, Maryland, as Headquarters Company, 1st Engineer Battalion. Redesignated 1 July 1962 as 4th Engineer Battalion, 4th Marine Division.

Redesignated 1 June 1976 as 4th Combat Engineer Battalion, 4th Marine Division. Participated in numerous training exercises throughout the 1970s and 1980s. Called to Active Duty December 1990 to participate in the Persian Gulf War. Released from Active Duty May 1991.

Global War on Terror
In January 2003 the Battalion activated and deployed personnel in support of Operation Iraqi Freedom. December 2004 activated and deployed personnel to serve as members of the 5th Civil Affairs Group and continue to support Operation Iraqi Freedom and Operation Enduring Freedom. 8 members of the battalion were killed supporting operations in Iraq.

Notable former members
Rob Jones

See also

 List of United States Marine Corps battalions
 Organization of the United States Marine Corps

References

Web

 4th CEB's official website

4th Marine Division (United States)
CEB4